Marek Beer (born 24 May 1988 in Český Krumlov) is a Czech male volleyball player. He is part of the Czech Republic men's national volleyball team. On club level he plays for VK ČEZ KARLOVARSKO.
Before his engagement in Karlovarsko, he also played for Alpen Volleys in German Bundesliga, HYPO Tirol Innsbruck in Austrian highest league, Dukla Liberec and SKV Ústí nad Labem in Czech extraliga.

References

External links
Profile at FIVB.org

1988 births
Living people
Czech men's volleyball players
Czech expatriate sportspeople in Austria
Expatriate volleyball players in Austria
People from Český Krumlov
Sportspeople from the South Bohemian Region